RTÉ's Home School Hub, or simply Home School Hub, and its companion show Home School Extra, was an educational television programme which was created in response to the closure of all schools during the COVID-19 pandemic in the Republic of Ireland in 2020. Announced on 21 March, it began broadcasting on RTÉ2 on 30 March, aimed at children attending 1st–6th class of primary school (i.e. roughly 6/7–12/13 years of age). The first series ended on 19 June. A new series After School Hub began on 11 October, broadcasting in the afternoon to cater for children whose parents are working from home. The series finished on 19 March 2021.

Format
The hour-long main show, broadcast Monday-Friday at 11am, typically consisted of three lessons, one from each of the main presenters, (qualified teachers Múinteoirs Clíona, Ray and John). As is standard for primary school education in Ireland, the teachers gave their lessons bilingually through English and Irish. In place of commercial breaks, the programme has smaller inserts from RTÉ-produced/commissioned educational programmes such as The Body Brothers, I'm an Animal, Pink Kong Studios' Urban Tails and Colm Tobin's Brain Freeze. Comic book artist Will Sliney also presents short drawing lessons in the "We Will Draw" segment.

A 15-minute-long compilation of material submitted by viewers relating to the content of recent shows, Home School Extra, narrated by Múinteoir Ray, was shown after the main show, and repeated at 4.15pm.

Irish Sign Language signed version of a previous main show has broadcast at 1pm from April to July.

Presenters
 Ray Cuddihy – a puppeteer, actor and voice-artist, who had previously worked with RTÉ Junior
 Clíona Ní Chíosáin – an actress and television presenter known for TG4's Aifric
 John Sharpson – an actor, YouTuber and teacher
 Emer O'Neill – a physical education teacher, activist, and a former basketball player 
 Séamus the dog – a puppet who has worked with RTÉjr

Cuddihy and Sharpson had previously worked together for their YouTube channel "Sharuf!", which features sketches, interviews and puppetry.

Smaller segments were presented by:
 Will Sliney, "We Will Draw" teaches drawing techniques
 Phil "Scientist Phil" Smyth, "Hub Lab" teaches science experiments to do at home
 Niamh Shaw, 'Space Hub' teaches space topics about planets, science and human missions past and present
 Dale McKay, beat boxing

Guests
Guests on the show included:
 Lenny Abrahamson, director
 Dermot Bannon, architect and presenter of RTÉ's Room To Improve 
 Thomas Barr, Olympic hurdler
 Sinéad Burke, teacher, fashion-designer and disability campaigner
 Eoin Colfer, author of Artemis Fowl 
 Marita Conlon-McKenna, author of Under The Hawthorn Tree
 Gordon D'Arcy, former Irish rugby player 
 Kenneth Egan, Olympic silver-medalist boxer
 Maeve Flynn, Dogs Trust Ireland 
 Kellie Harrington, Amateur world-champion boxer
 Claire Lambe, Irish rower 
 Rae Moore, award-winning architect 
 Sene Naoupu, rugby player 
 Shane O'Donoghue, Irish national team hockey player, olympian
 Niamh Shaw, scientist and space expert for RTE with an aim to go to space as communicator and writer
 Allie Sherlock, YouTuber and busker, discussed busking, and played with the RTÉ Concert Orchestra as part of the final episode
 Greta Streimikyte, Paralympic middle-distance runner
 Ryan Tubridy, RTÉ Radio 1 presenter and host of The Late Late Show and The Late Late Toy Show 
 Iseult Ward, co-founder and CEO of Food Cloud
 Sarah Webb, award-winning children's writer 
 Bus Éireann
 Children's Health Foundation, Crumlin
 The Dublin Fire Brigade
 Dublin Zoo
 Garda Síochána
 Irish Naval Service

Production
The show was produced by Dublin-Based Television and Film production company, Macalla Teoranta and shot in Scoil Lorcáin, a national school in Monkstown, County Dublin.

Cúla4 Ar Scoil
TG4, Ireland's Irish language television service launched its equivalent show Cúla4 Ar Scoil ("Cúla 4 at School") in April 2020. It was recorded in Connemara, with teachers Caitriona Ní Chualain and Fiachra O Dubhghaill. The service continued in September for the new school year, with Ní Chualáin, Orla Ní Fhinneadha, Micheál Ó Dubhghaill, Síle Ní Chonghaile, Caitríona McAtee and Joe Ó hEachtairn, though most schools had returned to operation.

Notes

References

External links
 
 Sharpson & Cuddihy's 
 
 
 

2020 Irish television series debuts
2020s children's television series
Irish television shows featuring puppetry
Television series with live action and animation
Early childhood education
English-language television shows
Irish-language television shows
RTÉ original programming
Children's education television series
Television series about educators
Television shows filmed in the Republic of Ireland
Television shows set in Dublin (city)